Groton Long Point Yacht Club (GLPYC) was charted in 1934 in the beach community of Groton Long Point, Connecticut and remains active today.  Functioning during the summer as something akin to a summer camp, the Yacht Club currently runs classes in sailing (420's, Optis, and Seashells), swimming, tennis, and sports.

References

External links 
 Groton Long Point Yacht Club

1934 establishments in Connecticut
Buildings and structures in Groton, Connecticut
Sailing in Connecticut
Yacht clubs in the United States